Mülkköy can refer to:

 Mülkköy, Kahta
 Mülkköy, İspir
 Mülkköy, Refahiye